Terry Morris may refer to:

 Terry Lesser Morris (1914-1993), American freelance magazine writer
Terry Morris (photographer)
 Terence Morris

See also
Morris (surname)